L'emmerdeur (literally The Troublemaker, with the English title of A Pain in the Ass, often promoted as A Pain in the A__<ref>A Pain in the A__ (1973), Scopophilia: Movies of the 60's, 70's and 80's), December 4, 2016, https://scopophiliamovieblog.com/2016/12/04/a-pain-in-the-a__-1973/</ref>) is a 1973 French-Italian black comedy film starring Jacques Brel, appearing in his tenth and final feature film. Directed by Édouard Molinaro and co-starring Lino Ventura, Caroline Cellier, and Jean-Pierre Darras, L'emmerdeur is an adaptation of Francis Veber's 1971 play Le contrat.

 Plot 

Ralph Milan is a contract killer who is paid to kill Louis Randoni, whose testimony in various trials could harm the organisation. Ralph waits for his prey in his hotel room, but is interrupted by his comical neighbour, a shirt salesman named François Pignon (Jacques Brel). Pignon, who is suicidal since his wife left him for a reputed psychiatrist named Fuchs (Jean-Pierre Darras), tries to hang himself on the waterpipes, but only manages to cause a flood. Realizing that if Pignon tries to kill himself again the police will search the place, Milan offers to talk him out of it until after his assassination. Unfortunately Pignon starts irritating him more, and makes it more difficult for him to fulfill his contract killing.

 Cast 
 Jacques Brel as François Pignon
 Lino Ventura as Ralf Milan
 Caroline Cellier as Louise Pignon
 Jean-Pierre Darras as Fuchs
 Nino Castelnuovo as The bellhop
 Angela Cardile as The future mother
 Xavier Depraz as Louis Randoni
 Jean-Louis Tristan as The hotel inspector
 André Valardy as The hitchhiker
 Jean Franval as The hitchhiker
 Pierre Collet as The butcher
 Arlette Balkis as The patient
 Éric Vasberg as The rally pilot
 Jacques Galland as Maître Chamfort
 François Dyrek

 Remakes 

The film was remade in the United States in 1981 as Buddy Buddy by Billy Wilder, starring Jack Lemmon and Walter Matthau. The film was remade in France in 2008 as L' Emmerdeur starring Patrick Timsit and Richard Berry. Neither remake was well received and the 2008 version was a conspicuous disaster, attracting derisory audiences.Fr 

The film also remade in Turkish as Baş Belası in 1982 directed by Kartal Tibet.

A remake in Hindi called Bumboo'' was released in 2012.

References

External links 

1973 films
Belgian black comedy films
Italian black comedy films
Italian buddy comedy films
French buddy comedy films
Films directed by Édouard Molinaro
Films shot in France
Films set in France
French films based on plays
1970s French-language films
1970s buddy comedy films
1970s black comedy films
French black comedy films
Films about contract killing
Jacques Brel
1973 comedy films
1973 drama films
1970s Italian films
1970s French films
Films with screenplays by Francis Veber
Films based on works by Francis Veber